Olubunmi Akinlade is an Anglican bishop in Nigeria: he is the current Bishop of Ife.

Notes

Living people
Anglican bishops of Ife
21st-century Anglican bishops in Nigeria
Year of birth missing (living people)